U16 or U-16 may refer to:

  U-16, U16, or U 16, an abbreviation of "under 16", a common designation for sports leagues or tournaments for players who are less than 16 years old.
 Austro-Hungarian submarine U-16
 German submarine U-16, one of several German submarines
 U16, one configuration of the U engine
 u16, a name for the 16-bit unsigned integer, especially in Rust